Orcadian dialect or Orcadian Scots is a dialect of Insular Scots, itself a dialect of the Scots language. It is derived from Lowland Scots, with a degree of Norwegian influence from the Norn language.

Due to the influence of Orkney fur traders working for the Hudson's Bay Company in early Canada, a creole language called Bungi developed, with substratal influence from Scottish English, Orcadian Scots, Norn, Scottish Gaelic, French, Cree, and Saulteaux Ojibwe.  Bungi is thought to have very few if any speakers and is potentially extinct.

In 2021, Orcadian poet Harry Josephine Giles released a science fiction verse novel, Deep Wheel Orcadia, in Orcadian Scots with parallel translation into standard English, described by their publisher as a "unique adventure in minority language poetry".

See also

References

External links
 The Orkney Dictionary
 Orkneyjar.com

Orcadian culture
Scots dialects